Dejan Lukić (born 28 September 1965 in Belgrade) is a former Yugoslav football player, from the 1980s and 1990s.

Lukić played for several clubs in Yugoslavia and Belgium. As a result of the mistake he's listed as a former KV Kortrijk player. The truth is that Dušan Lukić played for Kortrijk during the 1980s.

References

External links 

missed penalty

1965 births
Living people
Footballers from Belgrade
Yugoslav footballers
Serbian footballers
Yugoslav expatriate footballers
FK Radnički Niš players
FK Budućnost Podgorica players
FK Borac Banja Luka players
Yugoslav First League players
Expatriate footballers in Belgium
Yugoslav expatriates in Belgium
Association football forwards